İkinci Şahsevən (also, Shakhsevan, Shakhsevan Vtoroy, Shakhsevan Vtoroye, and Shakhseven Vtoroye) is a village and municipality in the Beylagan Rayon of Azerbaijan.  It has a population of 2,742.

References 

Populated places in Beylagan District